The Italian Catholic Diocese of Caltanissetta is in Sicily, It is a suffragan of the archdiocese of Agrigento.

History

Caltanissetta once belonged to the diocese of Girgenti, but was created an episcopal see by Gregory XVI, in 1844. At that time it was a suffragan of the archdiocese of Monreale. The first bishop was Antonio Stromillo.

The immense cavern of Caltabillotta is famous on account of the legend of a great dragon, driven away by the holy hermit Peregrinus when he chose that spot for a life of penance.

Bishops
Antonino Maria Stromillo, C.R. † (20 Jan 1845 – 7 Jan 1858 Died)
Giovanni Battista Guttadauro di Reburdone † (23 Dec 1858 – 26 Apr 1896 Died)
Ignazio Zuccaro † (22 Jun 1896 – 30 Apr 1906 Resigned)
Ven. Antonio Augusto Intreccialagli, O.C.D. † (22 May 1907 – 16 Mar 1914) Appointed, Coadjutor Archbishop of Monreale
Ven. Giovanni Jacono † (18 Mar 1921 – 21 Aug 1956 Retired)
Francesco Monaco † (2 Oct 1956 – 21 Dec 1973 Retired)
Alfredo Maria Garsia † (21 Dec 1973 – 2 Aug 2003 Retired)
Mario Russotto (2 Aug 2003–present)

References

External links
 Official page

Caltanisseta
Caltanissetta
Caltanissetta
1844 establishments in Italy